The Seychelles competed at the 2018 Commonwealth Games in the Gold Coast, Australia from April 4 to April 15, 2018.

Track and field athlete Dylan Sicobo was the country's flag bearer during the opening ceremony.

Medalists

Competitors
The following is the list of number of competitors participating at the Games per sport/discipline.

Athletics

Men
Track & road events

Women
Track & road events

Badminton

The Seychelles participated with four athletes (two men and two women).

Singles

Doubles

Mixed team

Roster
Juliette Ah-Wan
Allisen Camille
Kervin Ghislain
Steve Malcouzane

Pool D

Boxing

The Seychelles participated with a team of 3 athletes (3 men).

Men

Cycling

The Seychelles participated with 3 athletes (3 men).

Road
Men

Track
Sprint

Time trial

Scratch race

Squash

The Seychelles participated with 1 athlete (1 man).

Individual

Swimming

Men

Women

Table tennis

The Seychelles participated with 2 athletes (1 man and 1 woman).

Singles

Doubles

Weightlifting

The Seychelles participated with 3 athletes (2 men and 1 woman).

See also
Seychelles at the 2018 Summer Youth Olympics

References

Nations at the 2018 Commonwealth Games
Seychelles at the Commonwealth Games
2018 in Seychelles